St Louis Grammar School, Kilkeel is a Roman Catholic secondary school located in Kilkeel, County Down, Northern Ireland. It is a co-educational school for pupils aged 11 to 18, with about 700 pupils enrolled.

History
The school was founded in 1922 by the Order of St Louis as a selective Catholic boarding school for girls.

Catchment
The pupils come from the surrounding catchment area: Warrenpoint, Annalong, Newcastle, Castlewellan, Hilltown and Rostrevor.

Academics
The school is a co-educational Specialist School in Technology and ICT that caters for pupils aged 11–18.  It offers a broad range of subjects at all Key Stages including GCSEs, A levels and BTECs including Academic and Vocational/Applied subjects.  Staff offer the full range of STEM subjects - Science, Technology, Engineering, Maths and ICT. The school uses an online Virtual Learning Environment.

Results
In 2018, 84.1% of its entrants achieved five or more GCSEs at grades A* to C, including the core subjects English and Maths.

In 2019 the school was ranked 6th out of 159 secondary schools in Northern Ireland with 91.2% of its A-level students who entered the exams in 2017/18 being awarded three A*-C grades.

References

External links
School's official website

Catholic secondary schools in Northern Ireland
Grammar schools in County Down
1927 establishments in Northern Ireland
Specialist colleges in Northern Ireland
Kilkeel